The Cathedral of Our Lady of Nahuel Huapi Also San Carlos de Bariloche Cathedral is the main Catholic cathedral within the city of San Carlos de Bariloche, in Patagonia Argentina. It is located in large plot of land close to the Nahuel Huapi Lake, surrounded by beautiful gardens, and is within the Diocese of Bariloche, suffragan of the Archdiocese of Bahía Blanca.

For the construction of the cathedral of Bariloche, the architect Alejandro Bustillo offered his project for free. His sentiment was oriented in a Gothic Revival style with French reminiscences.

It was built between 1942 and 1944. The stained glass windows were laid in 1947.

See also
List of cathedrals in Argentina
Roman Catholicism in Argentina
Our Lady

References

Roman Catholic cathedrals in Argentina
Bariloche
Roman Catholic churches completed in 1944
Gothic Revival church buildings in Argentina
20th-century Roman Catholic church buildings in Argentina